Özmiş Khagan - was the last penultimate khagan of the Second Turkic Khaganate (Göktürks).

Background 
His father Pan Kul Tigin was a shad (governor) of the empire during the reign of Bilge Kutluk Khagan.  Although Pan Kül Tigin had staged a successful coup against Kutluk Bilge, he was killed during a battle against Ashina Shi and his Basmyls.  Following a short and turbulent term where Kutlug Yabgu Kagan tried to restore the authority without success, Özmiş was elected as the new khagan in 742.

Reign 
The policy of Tang China was to vassalize all people to the north of Chinese border line and Özmiş was also expected to pay respect. Initially, Özmiş agreed to visit emperor Xuanzong’s court and pay respect to the emperor, but then he changed his mind and tried to keep his independence. His reluctance annoyed the emperor and the emperor tasked his general Wang Zhongsi (王忠嗣) to arrest Özmiş. Wang Zhongsi organized a coalition of three Turkic people Basmyl, Uighur and Karluk, who had previously accepted the suzerainty of Chinese emperor, instead of Özmiş. The coalition defeated Özmiş. Although Özmiş escaped he was soon defeated for the second time and was killed in 744 by Ashina Shi.
Although the Turkic people elected Özmiş’s son Kulun Beg as their new khagan, his empire is usually considered to be collapsed by the death of Özmiş.

References

Göktürk khagans
8th-century Turkic people
744 deaths
Ashina house of the Turkic Empire
Year of birth unknown
Tengrist monarchs
8th-century murdered monarchs